The 1990–91 Midland Football Combination season was the 54th in the history of Midland Football Combination, a football competition in England.

Premier Division

The Premier Division featured 19 clubs which competed in the division last season, along with two new clubs:
Kings Norton Ex-Service, promoted from Division One
Sandwell Borough, relegated from the Southern Football League

League table

References

1990–91
8